Dwadzieścia (2008) is the second concert DVD of the punk rock band Pidzama Porno. Almost the whole of the material was recorded in Warsaw, in Palladium Club. This DVD also shows two bonus tracks from Pidzama's last concert in Poznań.

Track list
01. Co za dzień
02. Marchef w butonierce,
03. Xero z kota,
04. Wieczność feat. Spięty
05. Film o końcu świata
06. 28 (One love)
07. Nimfy (Baby) feat. Renata Przemyk
08. Kocięta i szczenięta
09. Odlotowa Dorota,
10. Bal o senatora '93,
11. Grudniowy blues o Bukareszcie
12. Chłopcy idą na wojnę feat. Spięty
13. Doniebawzięci,
14. Ezoteryczny Poznań,
Bisy:
15. Wojna nie jest Twoim stanem naturalnym
16. Harbour Of The Soul
17. Egzystencjalny paw
18. Twoja generacja
19. Welwetowe swetry
20. Antifa
21. Pasażerski
Poznan bonus:
1. Czas czas czas
2. Droga na Brześć

The band
Krzysztof "Grabaż" Grabowski - vocal
Andrzej "Kozak" Kozakiewicz - guitar, vocal
Sławek "Dziadek" Mizerkiewicz - guitar
Rafał "Kuzyn" Piotrowiak - drums
Julian "Julo" Piotrowiak - bass guitar

Guests:
Spiety (Lao Che)
Renata Przemyk

References

Pidżama Porno albums
2008 video albums
2008 live albums
Live video albums